Bakhcha (Baqsa) is a rural locality (a village) in Bik-Karmalinsky Selsoviet, Davlekanovsky District, Bashkortostan, Russia. The population was 78 as of 2010. There is 1 street.

Geography 
Bakhcha is located 22 km southeast of Davlekanovo (the district's administrative centre) by road. Vyazovka is the nearest rural locality.

References 

Rural localities in Davlekanovsky District